Vyšné Remety is a village and municipality in the Sobrance District in the Košice Region of east Slovakia.

History
In historical records the village was first mentioned in 1418.

Geography
The village lies at an altitude of 210 metres and covers an area of 5.358 km².
It has a population of 420 people.

Facilities
The village has a public library and a soccer pitch.

References

External links
 
https://web.archive.org/web/20070513023228/http://www.statistics.sk/mosmis/eng/run.html
http://en.e-obce.sk/obec/vysneremety/vysne-remety.html
http://vr.webconsult.sk

Villages and municipalities in Sobrance District